Drasteria convergens is a moth of the family Erebidae. It was discovered in the San Bernardino Mountains in California.

External links
Bug Guide
Images

Moths described in 2006
Endemic fauna of California
Drasteria
Moths of North America
Fauna without expected TNC conservation status